In Hell is a 2003 American action film directed by Ringo Lam. The film stars Jean-Claude Van Damme, with a supporting cast of Lawrence Taylor, Marnie Alton, Malakai Davidson and Billy Rieck. An adaptation of the 1978 film Midnight Express. It is the third and final collaboration between Jean-Claude Van Damme and Hong Kong film director Ringo Lam. The film was released on direct-to-DVD in the United States on November 25, 2003.

Plot

Kyle LeBlanc is an American working overseas in Magnitogorsk, Russia. When he hears his wife being attacked over the phone, Kyle rushes home, but is too late to save her. Sergio Kovic , the man who raped and murdered her, buys the judge and is found not guilty due to lack of evidence. Enraged, Kyle steals a gun from a bailiff and shoots Sergio multiple times in front of the entire courthouse, killing him. For this, he is sentenced to life in prison without parole. He is taken to Kravavi Prison, which is run by the corrupt warden, General Hruschov. Once he arrives, he is beaten by a guard for hesitating to give up his wedding ring. The same night, he witnesses a fellow 21-year-old American inmate named Billy Cooper being taken to another cell by the guards to be raped by prison fighter and member of the Russian Mafia, Andrei.

The next morning, a beaten and traumatized Billy is taken to infirmary by the guards as Andrei leaves the cell. Kyle gets into a brawl with Andrei, who provoked him in a way similar to his wife's murderer and is put in solitary confinement. In solitary, he goes on a hunger strike and then tries to hang himself to commit suicide, but both fail. When he experiences flashbacks of his wife, he realizes he must survive. Eventually, he is transferred to a cell with Inmate 451, an African-American prisoner with a reputation for killing his cellmates, something the sadistic Chief of the guards Lieutenant Tolik believes he will do to Kyle. However, over time, they begin to trust one another. He soon meets Billy in the prison yard, who explains he is serving a year-and-a-half sentence for driving whilst intoxicated and crashing into a restaurant with a girl he met. He also meets Malakai, another American prisoner bound to a wheelchair who explains the politics of the prison and the gangs within it, including the Russian Mafia's alliance with the guards.

General Hruschov gambles by betting on fights between rival gangs. Kyle, who is constantly bullied by Andrei and his goons, begins training himself for these fights, but his motivation concerns 451. In his first match, Kyle faces Andrei and (despite the Russian fighter's experience) manages to win by savagely biting a large chunk out of Andrei's neck, killing him in agony. He immediately suffers a mental breakdown while covered in Andrei's blood as the prisoners and guards watch in horror. Throughout his time, he continuously fights other prisoners and begins to accept his sentence, becoming hardened by his environment and losing himself while also gaining respect. He denies any help from his brother-in-law or the American embassy, feeling that nothing will change, and loses hope of ever being released. At one point, 451 asks him: "Do you even know who you are?" to which 451 answers himself: "Probably not." Meanwhile, Billy, fed up with the physical and sexual abuse he is subjected to, attempts multiple times to escape the prison, first by running during outside work detail, and again by sneaking off during the Russian Independence Day celebrations; the latter fails as he is betrayed by Malakai, who informs the guards because his need of special medicine and treatment. 451 discovers his betrayal and, in retaliation, sets him alight after pouring flammable fluid on him. As he watches Malakai burn to death, he recalls memories of being abused and molested as a child by a teacher and then setting the said teacher on fire.

After being locked in a cell with prison fighter Valya overnight to be raped, Billy is beaten to within an inch of his life after he spits in Valya's face. Billy eventually succumbs to his injuries, but before he dies, he advises Kyle not to let the prison, guards, or inmates make him into something he's not. With this advice, Kyle now knows he must fight another battle for his inner peace, as it is the only way he can become the man he once was. He refuses to fight Valya in his next match, and as a result, is hung by his arms outside for all to see. However, seeing Kyle's courage and his ability to stay strong during his long punishment, the prison gangs decide to put aside their rivalries and unite, following suit by refusing to fight when Hruschov commands it. Kyle is released soon from his restraints and sent to the infirmary. During his recovery, he dreams of his wife who tells him that nobody's ever gone as long as there is someone to remember them.

Sometime after Kyle has recovered, he is taken to his cellblock, where he is confronted by Hruschov, who is frustrated by his authority being challenged. He informs Kyle he only wants one last fight and forces him to face Miloc, a gargantuan prisoner kept separate from the general population whom Kyle kept hearing through the walls from his time in solitary confinement. During the fight, Kyle knocks on a door repeatedly, making Miloc recognize him, as this was his only form of communication, and he embraces him as a friend. A guard orders them to continue at gunpoint. Kyle demands the guards kill him instead, stating he will not fight anymore. Witnessing this, the prisoners begin to protest, resulting in Kyle and Miloc turning the tables on the guards and freeing the prisoners from their cells, igniting a full-scale riot. Miloc is fatally shot protecting Kyle, who comforts him as he succumbs to his wounds.

Soon, 451 agrees to assist Kyle in escaping from the prison. He also gives Kyle documents that contain evidence of all the murders and corruption that has happened in the prison for over 20 years, which he has planned to expose to the US government. While the guards get the prisoners under control following the riot, 451 shows Kyle a secret passage to the prison garage for their next move. It will, though, require Kyle to fight one more time to gain access, facing Valya. During the fight, Kyle gains the upper hand and dislocates Valya's shoulder. An enraged Valya pulls a knife and attempts to stab him only to accidentally stab the leader of the Russian Mafia, killing him. Kyle then uses this opportunity to smash Valya's head into a pole, stating it as retribution for Billy's death. Kyle is then escorted away by the guards to be killed. 451 launches an attack and kills one of them, while Kyle holds the other at gunpoint and pins him underneath a car. After taking the key to free himself, as well as retrieving his wedding ring, Kyle takes one of the guards' uniforms to disguise himself and drives off in one of their cars, while 451 stays behind to assassinate General Hruschov for his misdeeds. As Kyle successfully manages to escape, 451 successfully kills the General by ripping his tongue out with pliers; he is last seen being escorted away by the guards, with his final fate left unknown. Kyle manages to return to the United States and expose Kravavi's corruption and, three months later, the prison is shut down.

Cast
 Jean-Claude Van Damme as Kyle LeBlanc
 Lawrence Taylor as Inmate 451
 Marnie Alton as Grey LeBlanc
 Alan Davidson as Malakai
 Billy Rieck as 'Coolhand'
 Jorge Luis Abreu as Boltun
 Lloyd Battista as General Hruschov
 Michael Bailey Smith as Valya
 Robert LaSardo as Usup
 Carlos Gómez as Lieutenant Tolik
 Chris Moir as Billy Cooper
 Valentin Ganev as Bolt
 Paulo Tocha as Viktor
 Raicho Vasilev as Andrei
 Emanuil Manolov as Ivan
 Valodian Vodenicharov as Dima
 Veselin Kalanovski as Sasha
 Atanas Srebrev as Misha
 Asen Blatechki as Zarik
 Juan Fernández as Shubka
 Michail Elenov as Sergio Kovic
 Milos Milicević as Miloc
 Yulian Vergov as Solitary Guard

Release
In Hell was released on DVD in the United States on November 25, 2003.

Reception
Robert Pardi of TV Guide rated it 1/5 stars and called it a "pokey exercise in cellblock sadism" that does not live up Lam's previous work. Jason P. Vargo of IGN rated it 5/10 stars and wrote that it is "strictly for Van Damme fans only". Beyond Hollywood wrote that although the film has many stock characters, it enjoyably plays on the usual conventions of a Van Damme film. Ian Jane of DVD Talk rated it 3/5 stars and called it "a pleasant surprise" and the best of Van Damme's recent films. David Johnson of DVD Verdict wrote that although the film attempts to bring a new facet to Van Damme's films, it only ends up being clichéd in different ways than his usual films.

References

External links
 
 
 

2003 films
2003 action films
2003 direct-to-video films
2000s prison films
American films about revenge
American action films
American prison films
American vigilante films
Films directed by Ringo Lam
Films set in Russia
Films shot in Bulgaria
Nu Image films
2000s English-language films
2000s American films